The 2010 DePuy Hip Replacement Recall was instituted when DePuy Orthopaedics, Inc., a division of Johnson and Johnson, recalled its ASR XL Acetabular metal-on-metal hip replacement system on August 24, 2010.

Background
The recall came after data from a study indicated that the five year failure rate of this product is approximately 13%, or 1 in 8 patients.  Even if the defective device is replaced, it can leave behind dangerous, possibly deadly fragments that may not be discovered for years. DePuy identified reasons for the failure of the hip replacement system as component loosening, component malalignment, infection, fracture of the bone, dislocation, metal sensitivity and pain. Additional complications from the hip replacement system may include increased metal ion levels in the blood, bone staining, necrosis, swelling, nerve damage, tissue damage and/or muscle damage.

At the beginning of 2011, DePuy Orthopaedics said they were phasing out the ASR Hip Implant because of declining sales, but never mentioned the high failure rate data from an Australian implant registry.  In March 2011, The New York Times reported that DePuy issued its first warning to doctors and patients about the high early failure rate.  However, at this point, they still had not issued a recall of the product.  In fact, they claimed any statements referencing a recall were false.

Lawsuits
About 93,000 persons worldwide received an ASR implant. The first lawsuit in the United States against DePuy Orthopaedics was filed on June 15, 2010. Shine Lawyers commenced an Australian class action in the Federal Court of Australia on September 27, 2011, against DePuy International Pty Ltd and Johnson and Johnson Medical Pty Ltd. Both lawsuits claimed that the DePuy ASR hip replacement was defectively designed, that DePuy knew that there were problems with the implant early on but did not do anything to let patients or their surgeons know about the possible problems. The United States Judicial Panel on Multidistrict Litigation filed a ruling on December 7, 2010 that determined the fate of the thousands of lawsuits regarding DePuy Hip Recalls in the United States. Its ruling stated that all cases filed across the country, "are transferred to the Northern District of Ohio and, with the consent of that court, assigned to the Honorable David A. Katz for coordinated or consolidated pretrial proceedings."

On January 26, 2011, Judge Katz entered an order in the multidistrict litigation naming the leadership counsel for both the plaintiffs and the defendants.  Ben Gordon, Eric Kennedy, Ellen Relkin, Mark Robinson,  Christopher Seeger, and Steven Skikos were named on the plaintiffs' Executive Committee.  Robert Tucker and Susan Sharko were named as defendants' Co-Lead Counsel.  Discovery of documents from Johnson & Johnson and DePuy Orthopaedics has commenced.

In 2014, Johnson & Johnson announced it would not withdraw a $2.5 billion global settlement. Settlements began at a base of $250,000. Johnson & Johnson continued to deny culpability. 

On March 17, 2016, United States District Judge Ed Kinkeade, after receiving the juries verdict, signed final judgment for Case# MDL Docket No. 3:11-MD-2244-K.  The  jury awarded five plaintiffs (3:13-cv-1071, 3:14-cv-1994,3:12-cv-1672,3:11-cv-2800, & 3:11-cv-1941) a combined award of $120 million against DePuy Orthorpaedics Inc, and a combined award $240 million against Johnson & Johnson.

India 
Of the total number of people receiving the implants, about 4,700 were in India. As of 2018, J&J committed to working with the Indian government to support all Indian ASR patients. J&J had previously provided  to cover diagnostic and surgical costs to patients with defective implants, but the Indian government was concerned that these monies included no compensatory funds.

References

Further reading 
 Medical Device Alert: DePuy ASR TM acetabular cups used in hip resurfacing arthroplasty and total hip replacement, Medicines and Healthcare products Regulatory Agency, MDA/2010/044, 25 May 2010
 Medical Device Alert: All metal-on-metal (MoM) hip replacements, Medicines and Healthcare products Regulatory Agency, MDA/2012/008, 28 February 2012
 4 Corners Investigative Journalism report into ASR Hip Replacements, Quentin McDermott, 16 May 2011, Australian Broadcasting Corporation
 4 Corners Follow Up Report on ASR Hip Replacements, Quentin McDermott and Peter Cronau, 26 May 2014, Australian Broadcasting Corporation

External links
 ASR Hip Replacement Recall site

DePuy Hip Recall
Product recalls
Johnson & Johnson